The Sorcerer's Apprentice is a novel by François Augiéras. First published in France in 1964 as L'apprenti sorcier, it was translated into English by Sue Dyson in 2001 and published by Pushkin Press.

Plot summary
The novel is set in the Sarladais (the Dordogne region of France). An adolescent boy is sent to live with a 35-year-old priest, who becomes his teacher and spiritual mentor, and exerts a powerful control over the boy.  He abuses him physically and sexually, but the boy willingly accepts his 'punishment.'  The boy falls in love with a slightly younger, and very beautiful boy, meeting in secret and having sex.

This disturbing story is much more than a tale of a sexually violent predator. The adolescent himself experiences sexual activity with the other boy, but this relationship is one of genuine love and affection, rather than the coercive, harmful abuse he is subjected to by the priest.

1964 French novels
Novels set in Aquitaine
Novels with gay themes
Éditions Julliard books